Megalopsallus is a genus of plant bugs in the family Miridae. There are at least 30 described species in Megalopsallus.

Species
These 30 species belong to the genus Megalopsallus:

 Megalopsallus atriplicis Knight, 1927
 Megalopsallus brendae Schuh, 2000
 Megalopsallus brittoni Knight, 1927
 Megalopsallus californicus Schuh, 2000
 Megalopsallus ellae Schuh & Schwartz, 2004
 Megalopsallus ephedrae (Knight, 1968)
 Megalopsallus ephedrellus Schuh, 2000
 Megalopsallus femoralis Kelton, 1980
 Megalopsallus flammeus Schuh, 2000
 Megalopsallus froeschneri (Schuh, 1986)
 Megalopsallus humeralis (Van Duzee, 1923)
 Megalopsallus knowltoni (Knight, 1970)
 Megalopsallus latifrons Knight, 1927
 Megalopsallus marmoratus Knight, 1968
 Megalopsallus nicholi (Knight, 1968)
 Megalopsallus nigricaput Schuh, 2000
 Megalopsallus nigrofemoratus (Knight, 1968)
 Megalopsallus nuperus (Van Duzee, 1923)
 Megalopsallus pallidus (Knight, 1968)
 Megalopsallus pallipes (Knight, 1968)
 Megalopsallus parapunctipes Schuh, 2000
 Megalopsallus pictipes (Van Duzee, 1918)
 Megalopsallus punctatus Schuh, 2000
 Megalopsallus punctipes (Knight, 1968)
 Megalopsallus rubricornis (Knight, 1968)
 Megalopsallus rubropictipes Knight, 1927
 Megalopsallus sarcobati (Knight, 1969)
 Megalopsallus schwartzi Schuh, 2000
 Megalopsallus sparsus (Van Duzee, 1918)
 Megalopsallus teretis Schuh, 2000

References

Further reading

 
 
 
 

Phylinae
Articles created by Qbugbot